The Vote Bundle is the  collection of paperwork given daily to each to Member of the British House of Commons when the House is sitting. These are considered the practical daily working papers of the house.
This bundle usually includes:

 Summary agenda
 Order of business
 Standing committee notices
 Future business
 Order of business in Westminster Hall
 'The vote' (record of proceedings)
 Notices of questions
 Private business
 Notice of motions
 Notice of amendments
 Other documents

References

Political terms in the United Kingdom